Uyyakondan Thirumalai (also known as Karkudimalai and Thirumalainallur) is a suburb in the city of Tiruchirappalli, Tamil Nadu, India. Uyyakondan Thirumalai gets its name from the hill lock located in the locality. Located on the hillock is a temple dedicated to the Hindu god Shiva.

See also 
 Tiruchirappalli Fort

Notes

References 

Neighbourhoods and suburbs of Tiruchirappalli
Tourist attractions in Tiruchirappalli